Eric of Norway  may refer to:

Eric I of Norway, Eric I Bloodaxe (reigned c.930-934)
Eric II of Norway, Eric II Magnusson (reigned 1280–1299)
Eric of Pomerania, Eric III of Norway (reigned 1389–1442)

See also
 Eiríkr Hákonarson, earl who was de facto ruler of Norway 1000-1014